The initialism SJF might refer to:
Swedish Union of Journalists
Shortest job first or shortest job next, a scheduling algorithm
New Zealand rock band Straitjacket Fits